The Legume Information System (LIS) is legume sciences portal specifically for legume breeders and researchers, established and supported by the Agricultural Research Service of the United States Department of Agriculture. The mission of the Legume Information System is "to facilitate discoveries and crop improvement in the legumes," in particular to improve crop yields, their nutritional value, and our understanding of basic legume science.

Development of the Legume Information System is a joint venture between the National Center for Genome Resources (NCGR) and the USDA-ARS at Iowa State University. In 2014, development effort on LIS shifted from the comparative-legumes.org domain to legumeinfo.org. The comparative-legumes site was developed using the Ruby on Rails framework, and the LegumeInfo site is developed using the Tripal content management system.

The reference species as a backbone for orphan species research 
A fundamental approach taken in LIS is facilitate research in the orphan species by taking advantage of more extensive knowledge developed for the reference species. Use of synteny and local similarity, for instance, provides a basis for trait inference.

Reference species
Note that LIS makes use of the UniProt organism mnemonics for identifying species whenever possible.

The current legume reference species (also referred to as model organisms) are the following:
 Glycine max (soybean),  GLYMA
 Lotus japonicus (lotus),  LOTJA 
 Medicago truncatula (barrel medic), MEDTR 
 Phaseolus vulgaris (common bean), PHAVU

Orphan species
Orphan species represented at LIS are:
 Arachis duranensis (wild peanut), ARADU
 Arachis ipaensis (wild peanut), ARAIP
 Arachis hypogaea (peanut), ARAHY
 Cajanus cajan (pigeon pea),  CAJCA
 Chamaecrista fasciculata (partidge pea),  CHAFS
 Cicer arietinum (chickpea),  CICAR
 Lens culinaris (lentil), LENCU
 Lupinus albus (white lupin),  LUPAL
 Lupinus angustifolius (narrow-leafed lupin),  LUPAN
 Medicago sativa (alfalfa),  MEDSA
 Pisum sativum (garden pea), PISSA
 Trifolium pratense (red clover), TRIPR
 Trifolium repens (white clover),  TRIRE
 Vicia faba (faba bean),  VICFA
 Vigna angularis (adzuki bean), VIGAN
 Vigna unguiculata (cowpea), VIGUN

See also 
 Legumes
 Pulses

External links 
 Home page for the Legume Information System.

Dash, S.; Campbell, J.D.; Cannon, E.K.S.; Cleary, A.M.; Huang, W.; Kalberer, S.R.; Karingula, V.; Rice, A.G.; Singh, J.; Umale, P.E.; Weeks, N.T.; Wilkey, A.P.; Farmer, A.D.; Cannon, S.B. (2016). Legume information system (LegumeInfo.org): a key component of a set of federated data resources for the legume family Nucleic Acids Research 44 (Database issue): D1181-D1188. doi:10.1093/nar/gkv1159 PMC4702835

Biological databases
Web portals
Agricultural research